Kousalya Supraja Rama is a 2008 Indian Telugu-language romantic drama film directed by Surya Prasad and starring Srikanth, Charmee  and Gowri Munjal. The film released on 9 October 2008.

Plot

Cast 

Srikanth as Sriram
Charmee as Supraja
Gowri Munjal as Kausalya
Kota Srinivasa Rao as Ranga Rao
Sivaji as Ravi
Tanikella Bharani as Narasimham
Brahmanandam as a thief
Siva Reddy as Ranga Rao's son
Ali
Krishna Bhagavan
Venu Madhav
L. B. Sriram
Raghu Babu
Sairabanu as Subbulu
Uttej
Chalapathi Rao
Hema
Duvvasi Mohan
Apoorva
Junior Relangi
Anitha
Master Deepak

Production 
The film was initially titled Boss Gari Ammayi.

Soundtrack 
The music is composed by Koti.
"Kausalya Nachave Andamto Gichave Anchaate Nachaave" – Ramana Gogula, M. M. Srilekha (lyrics by Ramajogayya Sastry)

Reception 
Radhika Rajamani of Rediff.com rated the film 2  out of 5 and opined that "The performances, particularly Srikkanth's make the film work. Srikkanth is sincere in this film and one can certainly watch it for him. He is able to effortlessly switch between portraying the Good Samaritan and happily sing and dance too". A critic from 123Telugu wrote that "Srikanth played his part well but he can’t pull it off on his shoulders alone. The movie also has very obvious twists and unnecessary illogical goodness in it, which no rational soul can explain and get away with". Deepa Garimella of Full Hyderabad stated that "The story is passably average, but is propped up by healthy production values, good performances and sharp dialogue". A critic from Indiaglitz wrote that " Though the theme is good, the way it has been featured is boring and vague".

References